Cyrille Pouget (born 6 December 1972) is a French former professional footballer who played as a striker. While at Metz he played in the final as they won the 1995–96 Coupe de la Ligue.

References

External links
 
 

1972 births
Living people
Footballers from Metz
French footballers
Association football forwards
France international footballers
Ligue 1 players
FC Metz players
Servette FC players
Paris Saint-Germain F.C. players
Le Havre AC players
Olympique de Marseille players
AC Bellinzona players
AS Saint-Étienne players
Jeunesse Esch players
French expatriate footballers
French expatriate sportspeople in Luxembourg
Expatriate footballers in Luxembourg
French expatriate sportspeople in Switzerland
Expatriate footballers in Switzerland